The Spanish Town to Ewarton railway was a railway in Jamaica, built to serve the citrus growing regions in the interior of Saint Catherine, particularly those around the towns of Bog Walk, Linstead and Ewarton. It operated from 1885 to 1992.

History

The section from Linstead to Ewarton was closed in 1947. It was later reopened as far as the Bauxite processing plant just east of Ewarton.

The rest of the line closed to passengers in 1992 but it remains open for Bauxite traffic.

The Spanish Town to Bog Walk section reopened briefly for passenger traffic in 2009/10 while the A1 road through Bog Walk Gorge was closed for major repair work.

Gradients

Stations and Halts
There were 4 stations and 5 halts on the line:
Spanish Town Station (Branch Terminus)
St. John’s Road Halt
Angels Halt
Crescent Halt
Bog Walk Station
Michleton Halt
Linstead Station
Sterling Castle Halt
Ewarton Station] (Terminus)

Tunnels
There are 4 tunnels, from south to north:
Number 1 ~100 m
Number 2 ~160 m
Number 3 ~110 m
Number 4 ~665 m

Bridges
There are 7 significant bridges on the line:
Viaduct ~70 m
Thomas River ~15 m
Rio Cobre ~40 m
Viaduct (not visible in satellite imagery)
Rio Magno Gully ~85 m
Byndloss Gully ~20 m
Unnamed Gully ~40 m

Notes and references

External links
Jamaican train ride part 1 - Linstead to Bog Walk, Jamaicansol, youTube, 2011-08-09
Jamaican train ride part 2 - Bog Walk - Bog Walk Tunnel, Jamaicansol, youTube, 2011-08-09
Jamaican train ride part 2 - Bog Walk Tunnel - Angels, Jamaicansol, youTube, 2011-08-09

Railway lines opened in 1885
Standard gauge railways in Jamaica
Spanish Town